William Matthew O'Halloran (18 June 1934 – 13 December 1994) was an Australian cricketer. He played six first-class cricket matches for Victoria between 1962 and 1964.

Family
The son of Tom O'Halloran, and the (later) Mrs. C.S. Hayes, William Matthew O'Halloran was born at Corowa, in New South Wales on 18 June 1934.

He married Joan Beverley Rowland (1936-2021) in 1957.

Education

Caulfield Grammar School
He attended Caulfield Grammar School from 1950 to 1953, where he excelled as both a cricketer and as a footballer.

He later returned to the school as a member of staff: teaching there from 1958 to 1959, and from 1963 to 1966.

Melbourne University
He attended the University of Melbourne from 1954 to 1956. He graduated Bachelor of Commerce (B.Comm) on 20 March 1957.

Football
He played amateur football for Old Caulfield Grammarians in the Victorian Amateur Football Association (VAFA) over many seasons; and was named as an interchange in the club's "Team of the Century".

Cricket

Intervarsity cricket
In December 1956 he played for Melbourne University against Adelaide University, taking 6/41.

District cricket
A left-hand bat, and a right arm medium-pace bowler, he played in 218 First XI District Cricket matches, with St Kilda (192 games) and University (26 games) over 21 seasons  1953/54 to 1973/74  scoring 5,368 runs (av. 30.32) and taking 312 wickets (at 17.34).

Representative cricket
He also played in six representative matches for Victoria, scoring 115 runs (av. 12.77) and taking 4 wickets (at 50.50)  in one of those matches taking 2/26  over two consecutive cricket seasons: 1962/1963, and 1963/1964.

1962/1963
 1962: Victoria vs. M.C.C., MCG, December 1962.
 1962: Victoria vs. New South Wales, MCG, December 1962.
 1963: Victoria vs. South Australia, Adelaide Oval, January 1962.
 1963: Victoria vs. Western Australia, WACA, Perth, January 1962.

1963/1964
 1963: Victoria vs. South Australia, MCG, November 1963.
 1963: Victoria vs. Western Australia, MCG, November 1963.

See also
 List of Victoria first-class cricketers
 List of Caulfield Grammar School people

Notes

References

External links
 

1934 births
1994 deaths
People educated at Caulfield Grammar School
Cricketers from Melbourne
Australian cricketers
Victoria cricketers
Cricketers from New South Wales